Austrolittorina cincta is a species of sea snail, a marine gastropod mollusk in the family Littorinidae, the winkles or periwinkles, found in and endemic to New Zealand. Commonly called the brown periwinkle, or ngaeti in the Māori language. Although present in all parts of the country, it is more common in the south. Size up to 15mm in length.

References

Littorinidae
Gastropods described in 1833